Maccabi Ramat Gan is a handball team from the city of Ramat Gan, Israel.

Titles 
Israel Champions (1): 1960
Israel Cup Holder (1): 1978

References

Israeli handball clubs
Sport in Ramat Gan